Injo of Joseon (7 December 1595 – 17 June 1649), born Yi Jong, was the sixteenth ruler of the Joseon Dynasty of Korea. He was the grandson of King Seonjo and son of Prince Jeongwon. He was the king during the Later Jin invasion of Joseon, in which Later Jin withdrew the armies after their demands were met. However, in the subsequent Qing invasion, King Injo surrendered in 1636, agreeing to the subjugating terms outlined by the Qing.

Yi Jong is considered a weak and incompetent ruler as during his reign, Korea experienced the Yi Gwal's Rebellion, invasions from the Later Jin and Qing dynasty, and an economic recession.

Biography

Birth and background 
King Injo was born in 1595 as a son of Prince Jeongwon, whose father was the ruling monarch King Seonjo. In 1607, Prince Jeongwon's son was given the title, Lord Neungyang (綾陽都正, 능양도정) and later Prince Neungyang (綾陽君, 능양군); and lived as a royal family member, unsupported by any political factions that were in control of Korean politics at the time.

In 1608, King Seonjo fell sick and died, and his son, Gwanghaegun, succeeded him to the throne. At the time, the government was divided by various political factions; and the liberal Eastern political faction came out strong after the Seven Year War, which most actively fought against Japanese. The Eastern faction split during the last days of King Seonjo in the Northern and Southern political factions.  The Northern faction wanted radical reform, while the Southern faction supported moderate reform. At the time of Seonjo's death, the Northern faction, who gained control of the government at the time, was divided into left-wing Greater Northerners and less radical Lesser Northerners. As Gwanghaegun inherited the throne, the Greater Northern political faction, which supported him as heir to the crown, became the major political faction in the royal court. Meanwhile, conservative Western political faction remained a minor faction, far from gaining power; however many members of the Western faction continued to look for opportunities to return to politics as the ruling faction.

The coup of 1623 

Although King Gwanghaegun (光海君, 광해군) was an outstanding administrator and great diplomat, he was largely unsupported by many politicians, scholars, and aristocrats because he was not the first-born and he was born of a concubine. Greater Northerners tried to stomp out those opinions, suppressing Lesser Northerners and killing Prince Imhae (臨海君, 임해군), the oldest son of Seonjo, and Grand Prince Yeongchang (永昌大君, 영창대군), the queen's son. It was not Gwanghaegun's plan to keep his throne; and in fact, he actually tried to bring minor factions into the government, but was blocked by opposition from members of the Greater Northerners, such as Jeong In-hong and Yi I-cheom. The actions made Gwanghaegun even more unpopular among wealthy aristocrats, and they finally began plotting against him.

In 1623, members of the ultra-conservative Westerners faction, Kim Ja-jeom, Kim Ryu, Yi Gwi and Yi Gwal, launched a coup that resulted in the dethroning of Gwanghaegun, who was sent into exile on Jeju Island. Jeong In-hong and Yi Yicheom were killed, and followed suddenly by the Westerners replacing the Greater Northerners as the ruling political faction. The Westerners brought Injo to the palace and crowned him as the new King of Joseon. Although Injo was king, he did not have any authority since almost all of the power was held by the Western faction that dethroned Gwanghaegun.

Yi Gwal's Rebellion 
Yi Gwal thought he was mistreated and received too small a reward for his role in the coup. In 1624, he rebelled against Injo after being sent to the Northern front as military commander of Pyongyang to fight against the expanding Manchus, while other significant leaders of the coup were rewarded with positions in the King's court. Yi Gwal led 12,000 troops, including 100 Japanese (who defected to Joseon during Japanese invasions of Korea), to the capital, Hanseong, where Yi Gwal defeated a regular army under the command of General Jang Man (张晚) and surrounded Hanseong in what is known as the Battle of Jeotan. Injo fled to Gongju, and Hanseong fell into the hands of the rebels.

On February 11, 1624, Yi Gwal enthroned Prince Heungan (興安君, 흥안군) as the new King. However, General Jang Man soon returned with another regiment and defeated Yi Gwal's forces. The Korean army recaptured the capital soon after, and Yi Gwal was murdered by his bodyguard, resulting in the rebellion's end. Even though Injo was able to keep his throne, the uprising displayed the weaknesses of royal authority while asserting the superiority of the aristocrats, who had gained even more power by fighting against the rebellion. The economy, which was experiencing a slight recovery from Gwanghaegun's reconstruction, was again ruined, and Korea would remain in a poor economic state for a few centuries.

War with Later Jin and Qing 

King Gwanghaegun, who was considered a wise diplomat, kept his neutral policy between the Ming dynasty, which was Joseon's traditional ally, and the growing Jurchens (the later the Manchus and Qing dynasty). However, following the fall of Gwanghaegun, conservative Westerners took hard-line policy toward the Jurchen-led Later Jin dynasty, keeping their alliance with Ming dynasty. The Later Jin, who had up until that time remained mostly friendly to Joseon, began to regard Joseon as an enemy. Han Yun, who participated in the rebellion of Yi Gwal, fled to Manchuria and urged the Later Jin ruler Nurhaci to attack Joseon; thus the friendly relationship between the Later Jin and Joseon ended.

In 1627, 30,000 Manchu cavalry under General Amin (阿敏) and former Korean General Gang Hong-rip invaded Joseon, calling for restoration of Gwanghaegun and execution of Westerners leaders, including Kim Ja-jeom. General Jang Man again fought against the Later Jin, but was unable to repel the invasion. Once again, Injo fled to Ganghwa Island. Meanwhile, the Later Jin had no reason to attack Joseon and decided to go back to prepare for war against the Ming, and peace soon settled. The Later Jin and Joseon dynasties were declared brother nations and the Later Jin withdrew from the Korean peninsula.

However, most Westerners kept their hard-line policy despite the war. Nurhaci, who had generally good opinion toward Korea, did not invade Korea again; however, when Nurhaci died and Hong Taiji succeeded him as ruler, the Later Jin again began to seek for chance for another war. King Injo provided refuge to Ming general Mao Wenlong and with his unit, after they fled from the Later Jin and came to Korea; this action caused the Later Jin to invade Korea once again.

In 1636, Hong Taiji officially renamed his dynasty the Qing dynasty, and proceeded to invade Joseon personally. The Qing forces purposely avoided battle with General Im Gyeong-eop, a prominent Joseon army commander who was guarding the Uiju Fortress at the time. A Qing army of 128,000 men marched directly into Hanseong before Injo could escape to Ganghwa Island, driving Injo to Namhan Mountain Fortress instead. Running out of food and supplies after the Manchu managed to cut all supply lines, Injo finally surrendered to the Qing dynasty ceremoniously bowing to the Hong Taiji nine times as Hong Taiji's servant, and agreeing to the Treaty of Samjeondo, which required Injo's first and second son to be taken to China as captives.

Joseon then became a tributary state to the Qing dynasty, and the Qing went on to conquer the Central Plain in 1644.

Death of the Crown Prince 
After Qing conquered Beijing in 1644, the two princes returned to Korea. Injo's first son, Crown Prince Sohyeon, brought many new products from the western world, including Christianity, and urged Injo for reform. However, the conservative Injo would not accept the opinion; and persecuted the Crown Prince for attempting to bring in foreign Catholicism and Western science into Korea.

The Crown Prince was mysteriously found dead in the King's room, bleeding severely from the head. Legends say that Injo killed his own son with an ink slab that Sohyeon brought from China; however, some historians suggest he was poisoned by the fact that he had black spots all over his body after his death and that his body decomposed rapidly. Many, including his wife, tried to uncover what happened but Injo ordered immediate burial and greatly reduced the grandeur of the practice of Crown Prince's funeral. King Injo even shortened the funeral period for his son.

King Injo appointed Grand Prince Bongrim as new Crown Prince (who later became King Hyojong) rather than Prince Sohyeon's oldest son, Prince Gyeongseon. Soon after, Injo ordered the exile of Prince Sohyeon's three sons to Jeju Island (from which only the youngest son, Prince Gyeongan, returned to the mainland alive) and the execution of Sohyeon's wife, Crown Princess Minhoe, for treason.

Legacy 
Today, Injo is mostly regarded as a weak, indecisive and unstable ruler; for he caused the Yi Gwal Rebellion, two wars with the Qing dynasty, and a devastation of the economy. He is often compared to his predecessor, Gwanghaegun, who was dethroned, while Injo had almost no achievements during his reign and was still given a temple name. Blamed for not taking care of his kingdom, many people regard King Injo as a model for politicians not to follow; yet, he is credited for reforming the military and expanding the defense of the nation to prepare for war, since the nation had several military conflicts from 1592 to 1636. Injo died in 1649. His tomb is located in Paju, Gyeonggi Province.

Family 
 Father: Wonjong of Joseon (2 August 1580 – 29 December 1619) (조선 원종)
Grandfather: King Seonjo of Joseon (26 November 1552 – 16 March 1608) (조선 선조)
Grandmother: Royal Noble Consort In of the Suwon Kim clan (1555 – 10 December 1613) (인빈 김씨)
 Mother: Queen Inheon of the Neungseong Gu clan (17 April 1578 – 14 January 1626) (인헌왕후 구씨)
Grandfather: Gu Sa-maeng (1531 – 1 April 1604) (구사맹)
Grandmother: Lady Shin of the Pyeongsan Shin clan (1538–1662) (평산 신씨); Gu Sa-maeng's second wife
 Consorts and their Respective Issue(s):
 Queen Inyeol of the Cheongju Han clan (16 August 1594 – 16 January 1636) (인렬왕후 한씨)
 Yi Wang, Crown Prince Sohyeon (5 February 1612 – 21 May 1645) (이왕 소현세자), first son
 Yi Ho, Grand Prince Bongrim (3 July 1619 – 23 June 1659) (이호 봉림대군), second son
 Yi Yo, Grand Prince Inpyeong (10 December 1622 – 13 May 1658) (이요 인평대군), third son
 Yi Gon, Grand Prince Yongseong (24 October 1624 – 22 December 1629) (이곤 용성대군), fourth son
 First daughter (1626 – 1626)
 Fifth son (1629 – 1629)
Sixth son (1635 – 1635)
 Queen Jangnyeol of the Yangju Jo clan (16 December 1624 – 20 September 1688) (장렬왕후 조씨) — No issue.
 Royal Consort Gwi-in of the Okcheon Jo clan  (1617 – 24 January 1652) (귀인 조씨)
 Princess Hyomyeong (1637 – 1700) (효명옹주), second daughter
 Yi Jing, Prince Sungseon (17 October 1639 – 6 January 1690) (이징 숭선군), seventh son
 Yi Suk, Prince Nakseon (9 December 1641 – 26 April 1695) (이숙 낙선군), eighth son
 Royal Consort Gwi-in of the Deoksu Jang clan (1619 – 1671)  (귀인 장씨)
 Royal Consort Sug-ui of the Na clan (숙의 나씨) — No issue.
 Royal Consort Sug-ui of the Park clan (숙의 박씨) — No issue.
 Royal Consort Suk-won of the Jang clan (숙원 장씨) — No issue.
 Court Lady Yi (? – 1643) (상궁 이씨) — No issue.

Modern depictions 
Portrayed by Kim Dong-hoon in the 1981 KBS1 TV Series Daemyeong.
Portrayed by Yu In-chon in the 1986–1987 MBC TV series 500 Years of Joseon: Namhan Mountain Fortress.
Portrayed by Ahn Dae-yong in 1995 KBS TV series West Palace.
Portrayed by Lee Byung-joon in the 2000–2002 MBC TV series Tamra, the Island.
Portrayed by Kim Chang-wan in the 2008 SBS TV series Iljimae.
Portrayed by Choi Jung-woo in the 2008 KBS2 TV series Strongest Chil Woo.
Portrayed by Kim Kap-soo in the 2010 KBS2 TV series The Slave Hunters.
Portrayed by Sunwoo Jae-duk in the 2012–2013 MBC TV series The King's Doctor.
Portrayed by Lee Deok-hwa in the 2013 JTBC TV series Blooded Palace: The War of Flowers.
Portrayed by Kim Myung-soo in the 2014 tvN TV series The Three Musketeers.
Portrayed by Kim Jae-won in the 2015 MBC TV series Splendid Politics.
Portrayed by Park Hae-il in the 2017 film The Fortress.
Portrayed by Kang Tae-oh in the 2019 KBS2 TV series The Tale of Nokdu.
portrayed by Lee Min-Jae in 2021 MBN TV series Bossam: Steal the Fate.
Portrayed by Jo Kwan-woo in the 2021 tvN TV series Secret Royal Inspector & Joy.
 Portrayed by Yoo Hae Jin in the 2022 movie The Owl.

See also 
History of Korea
List of monarchs of Korea

References 

1595 births
1649 deaths
17th-century Korean monarchs